Fear and Trembling may refer to:

Novel
Fear and Trembling (novel), a 1999 novel by Amélie Nothomb

Cinema
Fear and Trembling (film), a 2003 French film based on the novel

Philosophy
Fear and Trembling, an 1843 philosophical work by Søren Kierkegaard

Television
Fear and Trembling (Fargo), a 2015 episode of the American series Fargo

Music
"Fear and Trembling", a song from the album Go Farther in Lightness by the Australian band Gang of Youths